María del Rosario López Piñuelas (born 28 October 1943) better known as Charo López, is a Spanish actress.

Filmography 
Plan Jack cero tres (1967)
El hueso (1967)
La vida sigue igual (1969)
Ditirambo (1969)
El extraño caso del doctor Fausto (1969)
Pastel de sangre (1971)
Me enveneno de azules (1971)
El bandido Malpelo (1971)
El sol bajo la tierra (1972)
 The Guerrilla (1973)
Don Yllán, el mágico de Toledo (1973)
Leyenda del alcalde de Zalamea, La (1973)
Las estrellas están verdes (1973)
La regenta (1974) directed by Gonzalo Suárez
 Unmarried Mothers (1975)
La Raulito en libertad (1975)
Largo retorno (1975)
Las cuatro novias de Augusto Pérez (1976)
Manuela (1976)
El límite del amor (1976)
Ah sì? E io lo dico a Zzzzorro! (1976)
Luto riguroso (1977)
Parranda (1977)
Los placeres ocultos (1977)
 (1978)
Adiós, querida mamá (1980)
Historias de mujeres (1980)
El gran secreto (1980)
Tres mujeres de hoy (1980)
Anima - Symphonie phantastique (1981)
De camisa vieja a chaqueta nueva (1982)
Adulterio nacional (1982)
La colmena (1982) directed by Mario Camus
L'Home ronyó, (1983)
Atrapado (1983)
Interior roig (1983)
Zama (1984)
Epílogo (1984)
Últimos tardes con Teresa (1984)
Crimen en familia (1985)
La Vieja música (1985)
Los paraísos perdidos (1985)
Tiempo de silencio (1986)
El rey del mambo (1989)
Cómo levantar 1000 kilos (1991)
Lo más natural (1991)
Don Juan de los infiernos (1991)
La fiebre del oro (1993)
Kika (1993) directed by Pedro Almodóvar
El día nunca, por la tarde (1994)
El detective y la muerte (1994)
Pasajes (1996)
Secrets of the heart (1997) directed by Montxo Armendáriz
Plenilunio (1999) directed by Imanol Uribe
Tiempos de azúcar (2001) directed by Juan Luis Iborra
La soledad era esto (2002) with Kira Miró
Nudos (2003) with Goya Toledo, Héctor Alterio, Santi Millán and Terele Pávez
Las llaves de la independencia (2005) with Yohana Cobo
Habitación en alquiler (2006)

Television 
Fortunata y Jacinta (1980)
Los gozos y las sombras (1982)
Los pazos Ulloa (1985)

Theatre 
 Tengamos el sexo en paz (2006-now)
 El infierno (2005)
 Las memorias de Sarah Bernhardt (2003)
 Los puentes de Madison (2002)
 Tengamos el sexo en paz (1995–1999)
 Carcajada salvaje (1994–1995)
 Hay que deshacer la casa (1988)
 Una jornada particular (1987)
 Los lunáticos (¿?)
 La marquesa Rosalinda (¿?)
 El condenado por desconfiado (¿?)
 La paz (¿?)

Awards 
 Goya Award for best supporting actress in Secrets of the heart (1997)
 Oso de Plata for the best actress in the Berlin Festival (1983)
 Golden India Catalina for the best supporting actress in Secrets of the heart (1998)
 Fotogramas de Plata for the best theatre actress (1997)
 Award of the Spanish Actors Union for the best supporting performance (1998)
 Nacho Martinez award at the Gijón International Film Festival (2010)

References

External links 
 

1943 births
Living people
People from Salamanca
Spanish film actresses
Spanish television actresses
Spanish stage actresses
Best Supporting Actress Goya Award winners
University of Salamanca alumni
20th-century Spanish actresses
21st-century Spanish actresses